The Great Fatsby is the second album by American rock guitarist, singer and songwriter Leslie West. It was released on Bud Prager's Phantom Records in March 1975 and distributed by RCA Records. The album features Mick Jagger on rhythm guitar. The album features four original tracks alongside West's interpretation of six other songs: covers of tracks by Paul Kelly, the Animals, the Rolling Stones, Sharks, Tim Hardin and Free. 

"Little Bit of Love" would be the first of four tracks by Free covered by Leslie West. Subsequently he released "The Stealer" (on Alligator), "Walk in My Shadow" (on Got Blooze) and "Woman" (on Blue Me).

Track listing
 "Don't Burn Me" (Paul Kelly)  3.01
 "House of the Rising Sun" (Traditional; adapted and arranged by Leslie West)  4.59
 "High Roller" (Corky Laing, Keith Richards, Leslie West, Mick Jagger, Sandra Palmer)  4.17
 "I'm Gonna Love You Thru the Night" (Corky Laing, Leslie West)  2.42
 "ESP" (Leslie West)  2.46
 "Honky Tonk Women" (Mick Jagger, Keith Richards)  3.20
 "If I Still Had You" (Ira Stone, Maxine Stone, Leslie West)  2.17
 "Doctor Love" (Andy Fraser)  2.59
 "If I Were a Carpenter" (Tim Hardin)  5.20
 "Little Bit of Love" (Andy Fraser, Paul Kossoff, Paul Rodgers, Simon Kirke)  2.35

Personnel
Leslie West – guitars, vocals, bass
Mick Jagger – guitar on "High Roller"
Joel Tepp – guitar, woodwind
Howie Wyeth – piano, Mellotron
Gary Wright – piano
Marty Simon – piano
Corky Laing – drums
Nick Farrentella – drums
Donald Kretmar – bass
Ken Hinckle – bass
"Buffalo" Bill Gelber – bass
Frank Vicari – horns, woodwind
Sredni Vollmer – harmonica
Dana Valery – solo vocal, backing vocals
Jay Traynor – backing vocals

Additional personnel
Bud Prager – executive producer
George Lopez – engineer
Harry Sandler – photography

References

1975 albums
Leslie West albums